Jaques is a given name and surname, a variant of Jacques.

People with the given name Jaques
 Jaques Bagratuni (1879-1943), Armenian prince
 Jaques Bisan (b. 1993) Beninese footballer
 Jaques Étienne Gay (1786-1864) Swiss-French botanist
 Jaques Lazier (1971-) American racing driver
 Jaques Morelenbaum (1954-) Brazilian musician
 Jaques-Louis Reverdin (1842-1929) Swiss surgeon
 Jaques Sterne (1695-1759) English cleric and politician
 Jaques Wagner (1951-) Brazilian politician
 Jaques le Vinier (c 1240-60) French troubadour

Fictional characters
 Jaques in Shakespeare's As You Like It

People with the surname Jaques
 Bob Jaques (born 1953), Canadian-American animation director
 Elliott Jaques, Canadian psychologist responsible for the notion of Requisite organization
 Faith Jaques (1923–1997), British artist
 Francis Lee Jaques, American wildlife artist
 Hattie Jacques (1922–1980), English comedy actress (born Josephine Edwina Jaques)
 Rev John Jaques (priest) (1728–1800), British clergyman who became prebendary of Lincoln Cathedral
 John Jaques (Mormon), American Latter Day Saint hymnwriter, missionary, and historian
 Jon Jaques, American-Israeli assistant men's basketball coach for Cornell University, who played for Ironi Ashkelon in Israel
 Peter Jaques (1919–2013), English cricketer
 Phil Jaques, Australian cricketer
 Robin Jacques (1920–1995), English illustrator (born Robin Jaques)
 Émile Jaques-Dalcroze, founder of Dalcroze Eurhythmics
 Sophie Jaques (born 2000), Canadian ice hockey player
 Victor Jaques (1896-1955), British army officer and lawyer

Other uses
 Jaques, Illinois, an unincorporated community in the U.S.A
 Jaques Nunatak, a glacial mountain in Antarctica

See also
 Jaques of London, a British game manufacturing company
 Jacques, given name and surname
 Jaquez, surname

Surnames from given names